Morgan Belmont (March 19, 1892 - September 17, 1953) was head of August Belmont & Co., the banking firm.

Biography
He was born on March 19, 1892, in Hempstead, New York, to August Belmont Jr. and Bessie Hamilton Morgan. He attended Harvard University and graduated in 1914. He became a senior partner in the investment house of August Belmont & Co. He retired in 1925.

In 1915 he married Margaret Frances Andrews. Her daughter, Margaret Andrews Morgan Belmont, was born in August 1917. His wife, Margaret Frances Andrews,  died on November 2, 1945.

He died on September 17, 1953, in East Hampton, New York.

References

Harvard University alumni
1892 births
1953 deaths
Belmont family
People from Hempstead (village), New York
American bankers
American people of German-Jewish descent